Pizzo del Torto is a mountain of the Lepontine Alps, located on the Swiss-Italian border, between Soazza and San Bernardo ai Monti (San Giacomo Filippo).

References

External links
 Pizzo del Torto on Hikr

Lepontine Alps
Mountains of the Alps
Mountains of Italy
Mountains of Graubünden
Italy–Switzerland border
International mountains of Europe
Mountains of Switzerland
Two-thousanders of Switzerland
Soazza